Sheikh Himyar bin Abdullah bin Hussein al-Ahmar (1970 –) is a Yemeni politician and the leader of Hashid tribal confederation. He is a GPC MP and served as deputy speaker of Yemeni Parliament. On 8 January 2023, Hashid's tribal leaders chose Hiymar to succeed his late brother Sheikh Sadiq al-Ahmar as chief of Hashid tribal confederation.

References 

Living people
Yemeni politicians
General People's Congress (Yemen) politicians
People from Amran Governorate
1970 births
Members of the House of Representatives (Yemen)
Yemeni tribal chiefs